Hameau (pl. hameaux) is the French word for hamlet (place), a small settlement.

Hameau may also refer to:

 Hameau (garden feature), imitation hamlets built for aristocrats in the 18th century
 Hameau de Chantilly, Château de Chantilly, 1774
 Hameau de la Reine, Château de Versailles, 1783 (associated with Queen Marie-Antoinette)
 Hameau de Chantilly (Paris), Elysée Palace, Paris, 1792, later an entertainment venue